Yellow Tape may refer to:

 Barenaked Ladies (EP),  commonly known as The Yellow Tape
 The Yellow Tape, a street LP by 40 Cal.
 Yellow Tape (Key Glock album), a mixtape by Key Glock
Yellow Tape 2, a 2021 sequel mixtape by Key Glock
 "Yellow Tape", a song by Chris Brown from Heartbreak on a Full Moon

See also
Barricade tape